Backaland is a settlement on the island of Eday in Orkney, Scotland. The settlement is also within the parish of Eday, and it is located to the south west of the island. Backaland is situated at the southern end of the B9063.

References

External links

Ports and Harbours of the UK - Backaland (Eday)
The Megalithic Portal - Green Farm, Eday
The Megalithic Portal - Southside Standing Stone, Eday

Villages in Orkney
Eday